UFC Fight Night: Hunt vs. Nelson (also known as UFC Fight Night 52) was a mixed martial arts event held on September 20, 2014, at Saitama Super Arena in Saitama, Japan.

Background
The event was the third time that the organization hosted a fight card in Saitama, following UFC 144: Edgar vs. Henderson in February 2012 and UFC on Fuel TV: Silva vs. Stann in March 2013.

The event was headlined by a heavyweight bout between Roy Nelson and Mark Hunt.

Tatsuya Kawajiri was briefly linked to a matchup at the event with Darren Elkins, however the bout never materialized as Kawajiri was sidelined indefinitely with a detached retina.

Chris Cariaso was originally scheduled to face Kyoji Horiguchi at the event. However, Cariaso was pulled from the bout with Horoguchi in favor of a matchup with current flyweight champion Demetrious Johnson at UFC 178. Horiguchi faced Jon Delos Reyes.

Kyle Noke was expected to face Yoshihiro Akiyama at the event, but eventually was forced out of the bout with a knee injury.  Akiyama instead faced Amir Sadollah.

Urijah Faber was briefly linked to a bout with Masanori Kanehara at the event. However, before the bout was officially announced, Faber was removed due to injury and Kanehara faced Alex Caceres.

Results

Bonus awards
The following fighters were awarded $50,000 bonuses:

Fight of the Night: Kyung Ho Kang vs. Michinori Tanaka
Performance of the Night: Mark Hunt and Johnny Case
^ Bonus winner Michinori Tanaka had his award rescinded after testing positive for banned substances during his post fight drug screening.

See also
List of UFC events
2014 in UFC

References

UFC Fight Night
Mixed martial arts in Japan
Sport in Saitama (city)
2014 in mixed martial arts